Henry Sampson (1 April 1947 – 19 July 1999) was a New Zealand cricketer. He played first-class cricket for Canterbury, Central Districts and Otago between 1970 and 1977.

See also
 List of Otago representative cricketers

References

External links
 

1947 births
1999 deaths
New Zealand cricketers
Canterbury cricketers
Central Districts cricketers
Otago cricketers
Cricketers from New Plymouth